Lieutenant-General William Barrell (died 9 August 1749) was an officer of the British Army.

Career
Barrell joined the Army as a captain on 27 March 1698. He served with distinction in the War of the Spanish Succession and was granted brevet rank as a colonel of Foot by the Duke of Marlborough on 1 January 1707. In 1715 he was made colonel of the 15th Regiment of Foot, and in 1727 he was promoted to brigadier-general. On 25 August 1730 he was removed to the 22nd Regiment of Foot, and on 8 August 1734 to the King's Own. He was promoted to major-general in 1735 and lieutenant-general in 1739; he also held the post of Governor of Pendennis Castle.

References

1749 deaths
British Army lieutenant generals
Grenadier Guards officers
King's Own Royal Regiment officers
Cheshire Regiment officers
28th Regiment of Foot officers
British military personnel of the War of the Spanish Succession
Year of birth unknown